The KPC Ngong Forest Land Scandal was a scandal that resulted in the suspension in October 2012 of Kenyan Government Minister William Ruto who was charged in court as a result.

Mr Ruto and four other persons faced fraud charges over the alleged sale of a piece of land in Ngong forest to Kenya Pipeline Company (KPC) for Sh272 million. The minister allegedly received Sh96 million at various intervals during the alleged transaction. In the case, Mr. Ruto and Berke Commercial Agencies, a company associated with him, Mr Joshua Kulei, a former aide of retired president Daniel Moi, Mr Sammy Mwaita (the Member of Parliament for Baringo Central Constituency) and two other firms were sued for allegedly obtaining money from KPC between 6 August and 6 September 2001.

In April 2011, Mr. Ruto was acquitted of the Sh43 million land fraud charges for lack of evidence after the prosecution failed to produce in court the then Finance Manager Hellen Njue to give her evidence on how she paid out the money. His co-accused, Mr Joshua Kulei and Mr Sammy Mwaita, were also set free.

References

Politics of Kenya
2010 in Kenya
2010 in law
Law of Kenya
Corruption in Kenya